Wadjda is a 2012 Saudi Arabian drama film, written and directed by Haifaa al-Mansour (in her feature directorial debut). It was the first feature film shot entirely in Saudi Arabia and the first feature-length film made by a female Saudi director. It won numerous awards at film festivals around the world. The film was selected as the Saudi Arabian entry for the Best Foreign Language Film at the 86th Academy Awards (the first time the country made a submission for the Oscars), but it was not nominated. It successfully earned a nomination for Best Foreign Film at the 2014 BAFTA Awards.

Plot
In the 2000s, Wadjda, a spirited 10-year-old living in Riyadh, dreams of owning a green bicycle that she passes at a store every day on her way to school. She wants to race her friend Abdullah, a boy from her neighborhood, but riding bikes is frowned upon for girls and Wadjda's mother refuses to buy one for her. The bike is expensive, costing SR800 (~$213).

Wadjda begins to earn the money herself by selling mixtapes, hand-braiding bracelets for classmates, and acting as a go-between for an older student. These activities get her into trouble with the strict headmistress. Her mother, meanwhile, is dealing with a job that has a terrible commute with a driver who often gets angry with her for making him wait. He tells Wadjda's mother that he will no longer drive her to work, but Wadjda and Abdullah find where the driver lives and visit his house to tell him to take her mother's business. After Abdullah threatens to have his uncle deport the driver, he agrees.

Meanwhile, Wadjda's grandmother on her father's side is looking for a second wife for her son because Wadjda's mother cannot have any more children and Wadjda's uncle wants a son. Wadjda's mother is angry and scared by this, so she tries on a beautiful red dress for her brother-in-law's wedding to gain support and to "scare off" any potential women who may consider marrying him.

At school, Wadjda decides to join the religion club to participate in a Quran recital competition featuring a SR1,000 cash prize (equivalent of about US$270). Meanwhile, two girls at the madrasa caught by the headmistress for adorning themselves with nail polish and marker-drawn ankle tattoos are surprised when Wadjda, in keeping with her new pious image, does not stand with them by testifying in their favor. Wadjda's efforts at memorization impress her teacher, and she wins the competition. The staff and students are shocked when Wadjda announces her intention to buy a bicycle with the prize money. The headmistress is furious, and instead donates the reward to Palestine against Wadjda's will.

Abdullah offers Wadjda his bike (which she does not accept) and says he wants to marry her when they are older. Wadjda returns home to find her father and begins crying when he says he is proud that she won the competition. After a brief conversation, he asks Wadjda to tell her mother that he loves her, and leaves the house to take a phone call. Later, Wadjda finds out that her father has taken a second wife as she joins her mother in viewing the wedding ceremony from their rooftop. Wadjda suggests that her mother could buy the red dress and win her father back again, but her mother reveals that she has instead spent the money on the green bike her daughter wants. The two hug as fireworks from the wedding light up the night sky behind them.

The next day, Wadjda rides down the street on her new bike. The owner of the bike shop sees her passing and smiles. She races Abdullah and wins.

Cast
Reem Abdullah as Mother
Waad Mohammed as Wadjda (وجدة)
Abdullrahman Al Juhani as Abdullah
Sultan Al Assaf as Father
Ahd Kamel as Ms Hussa (credited as Ahd)
Ibrahim Al Mozael as Toyshop Owner
Nouf Saad as Qu'ran Teacher
Rafa Al Sanea as Fatima
Alanoud Sajini as Fatin
Rehab Ahmed as Noura
Dana Abdullilah as Salma 
Mohammed Zahir as Iqbal – the Driver

Production
According to the director Haifaa al-Mansour, it took five years to make Wadjda. She spent most of the time trying to find financial backing and getting filming permission, since she insisted on filming in Saudi Arabia for reasons of authenticity. She received backing from Rotana, the film production company of Prince Alwaleed bin Talal. However, she very much wanted to find a foreign co-producer because "in Saudi there are no movie theatres, there is no film industry to speak of and, therefore, little money for investment". After her selection for a Sundance Institute writer's lab in Jordan, al-Mansour got in touch with the German production company Razor Film, which had previously produced films with Middle-Eastern topics (Paradise Now and Waltz with Bashir). The production involved co-operation with two German public TV broadcasters, Norddeutscher Rundfunk and Bayerischer Rundfunk.

Al-Mansour's screenplay was influenced by neorealist cinema such as Vittorio De Sica's Bicycle Thieves, Jafar Panahi's Offside and the Dardenne brothers' Rosetta. The final scene recalls the final scene of François Truffaut's The 400 Blows. Al-Mansour says that the original version of her screenplay was much bleaker than the finished product: "I decided I didn't want the film to carry a slogan and scream, but just to create a story where people can laugh and cry a little." Al-Mansour based the character of Wadjda on one of her nieces and also on her own experiences when growing up. The main themes of the story are freedom, as represented by the bicycle, and the fear of emotional abandonment, as Wadjda's father wants to take a second wife who will provide him with a son.

Wadjda was filmed on the streets of Riyadh, which often made it necessary for the director to work from the back of a van, as she could not publicly mix with the men in the crew. Often, she could only communicate via walkie-talkie and had to watch the actors on a monitor. This made it difficult to direct: "It made me realise the need to rehearse and to develop an understanding for each scene before we shot it."

Waad Mohammed, who plays Wadjda, was a first-time actress.

Reception
Wadjda received critical acclaim. The film-critics aggregate Rotten Tomatoes reported 99% of critics gave the film a positive review based on 122 reviews, with an average score of 8/10. The critical consensus is: "Transgressive in the best possible way, Wadjda presents a startlingly assured new voice from a corner of the globe where cinema has been all but silenced." Metacritic, which assigns a standardized score out of 100, rated the film 81 based on 26 reviews, indicating "universal acclaim".

Film critics cite the ways Wadjda is able to grapple with important societal issues, while also accurately understanding the limits of large scale change. New York Times film critic A.O. Scott states, "With impressive agility, Wadjda finds room to maneuver between harsh realism and a more hopeful kind of storytelling"; it accurately shows the immense challenges women face in Saudi Arabia, while also showing that there is room for change and growth. The New Yorker film critic Anthony Lane feels similarly, as he argues that there are many ways Wadjda could have done more of a disservice to women in Saudi Arabia, rather than helping expose their inequality. He says that Wadjda strikes the right balance, in that it is enjoyable to watch, while also effective in calling for social change.

Ann Hornaday of The Washington Post also reviewed the film positively, praising the story as well as the film’s attention to the “myriad visual and textural details of modern life in Saudi Arabia, a place of dun-colored monotony, cruelty and hypocrisy, as well as prosperity, deep devotion and poetry”.

Release
The film premiered at the Venice Film Festival in August 2012. It was released in Germany by Koch Media in 2013. Other distributors are: Pretty Pictures (France, theatrical), Sony Pictures Classics (USA, theatrical), Wild Bunch Benelux (Netherlands, theatrical), The Match Factory (Non-USA, all media) and Soda Pictures (UK, all media). It has been shown at several film festivals:

Other screenings include as the opening film of the 6th Gulf Film Festival in Dubai (11–17 April) and at the Tribeca Film Festival in New York (21/25 April). The film was scheduled to be released on DVD in February 2014.

Awards

See also

 Women and bicycling in Islam
 Cinema of Saudi Arabia
 List of Saudi Arabian films
 List of submissions to the 86th Academy Awards for Best Foreign Language Film
 List of Saudi Arabian submissions for the Academy Award for Best Foreign Language Film

References

External links
 Official website
 
 
 
 
 

2012 films
2012 drama films
2010s Arabic-language films
Cycling films
Saudi Arabian drama films
Films directed by Haifaa al-Mansour
Sony Pictures Classics films
Films set in Saudi Arabia
2010s feminist films
2010s coming-of-age drama films
2012 directorial debut films